Heng and Ha are two generals of the Shang dynasty in Chinese mythology, featured within the 16th-century Chinese fantasy novel Investiture of the Gods. These two fictional characters were created by the author of Investiture of the Gods based upon the vajra warriors, two guards of Buddhist temples in East Asia, and have become their common names in Chinese.

Novel
In the Investiture of the Gods, the Heng or Hengjiang is named Zheng Lun and the Ha or Hajiang is named Chen Qi, both are officials of guarding the grain in the Shang dynasty. Finally, Jiang Ziya canonized and added them to Feng Shen Bang'''s list.

Buddhism
In Chinese Buddhism, Heng and Ha are the common names of the jingang lishi'', two guards of Buddhist temples. They are usually placed on both sides of the Shanmen. They hold vajras (short metal weapon that has the symbolic nature of a diamond), namely "Narayana" (Buddha's warrior attendant) or "Yaksha Deity" or "Zhi Jin Gang" in Chinese. The Vajra originally refers to the short metal weapon of king of all heavenly deities Indra in Indian Buddhist deities and symbolizes solidness and sharpness in Buddhism. Narayana is a Dharmapala who protects Buddhism with his Vajra in his hand.

Originally, there was only one Narayana in Buddhism, after the introduction of Buddhism from India to China it had a profound influence on Chinese traditional culture and folk customs. In order to meet Chinese custom of being in pairs, Chinese people cast two Narayana to safeguard the Shanmen of Buddhist temples. They are wearing crowns, ethereal clothes with their upper bodies exposed, with well-developed muscles and short skirts. They have widely open eyes and protruding noses, holding Vajras in their hands, and glaring the ground awesomely and angrily. The right one, has its mouth open to pronounce the sound "a", while the other has it closed to utter the sound "heng". The symbolism is the same already seen. The generic name for statues with an open mouth is Ha ("a" shape), that for those with a closed mouth Heng ("heng" shape). The two sounds are the start and end sounds in Sanskrit, symbolizing the basis of sounds and bearing the profound theory of Dharma. It is encountered throughout East Asia, including in Japan and Korea. In Japan, Heng and Ha are called A-un.

Gallery

See also
 Shanmen
 A-un
 Menshen

References

Bibliography

Further reading
 
 

Investiture of the Gods characters
Chinese gods
Buddhist gods